Matej Jurčo (born 8 August 1984 in Poprad) is a Slovak former professional road bicycle racer, who competed professionally between 2004 and 2015. He is the son of Milan Jurčo, who was also a professional cyclist.

Matej Jurčo was a multinational champion in the individual time trial, as well as a national champion in the road race in 2008.

Major results

1999
 3rd Road race, European Youth Olympic Games
2002
 1st 
 1st Oberosterreich-Junioren-Rundfahrt
 1st UCI Juniors World Challenge
 1st Kroz Istru
 2nd Overall Tour de Taiwan
 2nd Overall Grand Prix Général Patton
 3rd Overall Grand Prix Rüebliland
 4th Overall 
 5th Road race, UCI Junior World Road Championships
2003
 1st  Time trial, World Military Championships
 1st Overall GP Lidice
 1st Stage 5 Tour d'Egypte
 1st Stage 1 Tour of Slovakia
 2nd Overall Tour de Hongrie
1st Prologue & Stage 6
 2nd GP Bradlo
 5th GP Pribram
 6th GP ZTS Dubnica
 9th Overall Ytong Bohemia Tour
2004
 National Road Championships
1st  Time trial
2nd Road race
 3rd Overall UNIQA Classic
2005
 1st  Time trial, National Road Championships
2006
 1st  Time trial, National Road Championships
2008
 National Road Championships
1st  Road race
1st  Time trial
2009
 2nd Overall Grand Prix de Gemenc
 3rd Overall GP Bradlo
2010
 1st Stage 4 Vuelta del Uruguay
2011
 2nd Road race, National Road Championships
 2nd Banja Luka–Beograd II
 3rd Puchar Ministra Obrony Narodowej
 4th Overall Dookoła Mazowsza
1st Stage 1
 6th Duo Normand (with Pavol Polievka)
 8th Overall Tour du Maroc
 8th Overall Tour of Małopolska
 8th Challenges Phosphatiers I
2012
 Czech Cycling Tour
1st Stages 1 (TTT) & 4
 3rd Time trial, National Road Championships
 4th Grand Prix Královéhradeckého kraje
 7th Overall Tour of Małopolska
2013
 2nd GP Kranj
 4th Košice–Miskolc
 5th Road race, World Military Championships
 5th Overall Tour du Maroc
 5th Mayor Cup
 10th Central European Tour, Budapest GP
2014
 7th GP Hungary

External links
 
 
 

Cyclists at the 2004 Summer Olympics
Cyclists at the 2008 Summer Olympics
Olympic cyclists of Slovakia
Slovak male cyclists
1984 births
Living people
Sportspeople from Poprad